Bencherif is the name of several people:

Adel Bencherif (born 1975), French actor
Hamza Bencherif (born 1988), footballer
Ahmed Bencherif (1927–2018), soldier, politician